Neocompsa thelgema is a species of beetle in the family Cerambycidae. It was described by Martins in 1971.

References

Neocompsa
Beetles described in 1971